Morum oniscus is a species of sea snail, a marine gastropod mollusk in the family Harpidae, the harp snails.

Distribution
From Bermuda to southeastern Florida (Palm Beach County) and the Florida Keys, 
throughout the Bahamas and the entire Caribbean Sea Basin, 
south to the Lesser Antilles and Barbados(rare at Barbados). 
The species is absent from the Gulf of Mexico.

References

 Dance, S.P. & G.T. Poppe, 1999 Family Harpidae. In : A Conchological Iconography (ConchBooks, ed.), 69 p.
 Petuch E.J. & Berschauer D.P. (2020). A review of the genus Morum (Gastropoda: Harpidae) in the Western Atlantic, with the description of two new species from Brazil. The Festivus. 52(1): 60–69.

External links
 Linnaeus, C. (1767). Systema naturae per regna tria naturae: secundum classes, ordines, genera, species, cum characteribus, differentiis, synonymis, locis. Ed. 12. 1., Regnum Animale. 1 & 2. Holmiae, Laurentii Salvii. Holmiae [Stockholm], Laurentii Salvii. pp. 1–532 [1766] pp. 533–1327
 Scopoli I.A. (1786). Deliciae florae et faunae Insubricae Pars 1 and 2. [iv] + 115 pp., frontispiece, 25 pls. Monasterii S. Salvatoris: Ticini
  Rosenberg, G.; Moretzsohn, F.; García, E. F. (2009). Gastropoda (Mollusca) of the Gulf of Mexico, Pp. 579–699 in: Felder, D.L. and D.K. Camp (eds.), Gulf of Mexico–Origins, Waters, and Biota. Texas A&M Press, College Station, Texas.

Harpidae